Abdullah bin Ali bin Muhammad bin Ibrahim bin Muhammad Al-Marri Al-Abdi Al Uyuni was the founder and Hakim of the Uyunid Emirate ruling from 1074 to 1107.  He succeeded in removing the Qarmatians from eastern Arabian Peninsula.

Lineage and dynastic etymology
Al Uyuni was a descendent from the Banu Abdul Qays tribe, although it is unclear from which branch. Some sources indicate the Al-Marri as a Marra bin Amer bin al-Harith bin Anmar bin Amr bin Wadia ’bin Lakiz bin Afsa bin Abdul Qays, but Abu al-Faraj al-Isfahani spoke of a prince named Abu Senan Muhammad bin al-Fadl bin Abdullah bin Ali Al-Abdi Al-Marri. The Uyunid rulers were also named Al Ibrahim after Al Uyuni’s great-grandfather. Since the tribe once lived in the village of Al Oyun in the Al-Ahsa Oasis, the family was named after it, that is, Al Uyuni. The Abdul Qays tribe stemmed from Rabi'a ibn Nizar, the ancestor of the Eastern Arabian tribes and son of Nizar ibn Ma'ad.

Founding the state

Revolt Against the Qarmatians
Political, social and economic conditions in the Qarmatian state had reached a critical point when Al Uyuni began his revolt. He struggled at first in his skirmishes with the authorities given that he started with only around 400 supporters from the Abdul Qays, but other tribes took advantage of the weakened authority and eventually joined in. Al Uyuni’s troops forced the Qarmatians to withdraw to the Al-Ahsa Oasis while the loyal tribes withdrew to the Syrian Desert, culminating in a seven-year war of attrition and a siege of the Qarmatian capital at Qatif.

End of the Qarmatians
The final overthrow of the Qarmatians started with the revolt of Abu al-Bahlul al-Awwam, but the deathblow was struck once Al Uyuni petitioned the Abbasid caliph Al-Qa'im and the Seljuk Emperor Malik-Shah I (represented by his vizier Nizam al-Mulk) for reinforcements in 1072 or 1073. Malik-Shah was the more receptive of the two sovereigns in his eagerness for suzerainty over Al-Ahsa and to avenge his general Kajkina’s defeat at the hands of the Qarmatian troops of Yahya ibn Ayyash. Therefore, the Turkmen commander, Axsek Salar, was dispatched from the Seljuk capital of Baghdad to Al-Ahsa, from where he marched through Basra to Qatif. Salar looted Qatif and confiscated the treasury of Ibn Ayyash (who had fled to Awal Island, now Bahrain). Afterwards, the Seljuks assisted Al Uyuni’s siege of Al-Ahsa, ultimately leaving 200 soldiers to garrison it. Finally in 1078, at what was called the “Battle of the Two Rivers,” the Qarmatians and their Banu Amir allies were routed and surrendered.

Restoring Qatif
After the retreat of the Seljuk army, however, Ibn Ayyash recaptured Qatif, but he was rebuffed by Al Uyuni, who proceeded to occupy Bahrain. Finally killing Ibn Ayyash in battle, Al Uyuni was free to unite Eastern Arabia and Bahrain into one state, the Uyunid Emirate, based in Al-Ahsa.

Royal dynasty
 Uyunid dynasty

See also
 Al-Hasa
 Qatif
 Bahrain 
 List of Muslim empires and dynasties

References

References
 Abdelkader Statistical: masterpiece beneficiary on Ahsa in the old and the new, the achievement Hamad Al-Jasser Riyadh 1960.

11th-century Arabs
12th-century Arabs
Arab history
Uyunid dynasty

ar:العيوني